Aleksandr Ivanovich Laveykin (born April 21, 1951) is a retired Soviet cosmonaut.

Biography 
Born in Moscow, Laveykin was selected as a cosmonaut on December 1, 1978. He flew on one spaceflight, for the first part of the long duration expedition Mir EO-2. He flew as a flight engineer, and was both launched and landed with the spacecraft Soyuz TM-2. He spent 174 days 3 hours 25 minutes in space. Married with one child, Laveykin retired on March 28, 1994.

Launched in February 1987, his spaceflight was intended to last until December 1987, but doctors on the ground determined that he was having minor heart irregularities. For this reason, in July he was replaced by Soviet cosmonaut Aleksandr Pavlovich Aleksandrov, who stayed on Mir to the end of the expedition in December.

Awards 
 Hero of the Soviet Union
 Pilot-Cosmonaut of the USSR
 Order of Lenin and the Russian Federation Medal "For Merit in Space Exploration"

References

1951 births
Living people
Soviet cosmonauts
Heroes of the Soviet Union
Recipients of the Medal "For Merit in Space Exploration"
Spacewalkers
Mir crew members